McLean Island  is a small island in the South Saskatchewan River north of the Estuary ghost town in Saskatchewan, Canada. The island is just west of the Estuary Ferry.

References 

South Saskatchewan River
River islands of Saskatchewan